Zinseler (Italian: Cima di Stilves) is a mountain in the Sarntal Alps in South Tyrol in Italy. It has an elevation of 2,422 m and is located near Penser Joch saddle (Passo di Pennes) close to the city of  Sterzing.

External links 

Mountains of South Tyrol
Sarntal Alps
Mountains of the Alps